WVCU-LP is a Variety formatted low-power broadcast radio station licensed to Athens, West Virginia, serving Athens and Princeton in West Virginia.  WVCU-LP is owned and operated by Concord University.

References

External links
 Mountain Lion Radio Online
 

2015 establishments in West Virginia
Variety radio stations in the United States
Radio stations established in 2015
VCU-LP
VCU-LP